"For What It's Worth" is the second single from Stevie Nicks' 2011 album In Your Dreams. The song was released to radio on July 11, 2011 and debuted at No. 25 on the Billboard Adult Contemporary chart during the week of September 19, 2011.

Track listing
"For What It's Worth" (edit) (Nicks, Campbell) — 4:03 
"For What It's Worth" (album version) (Nicks, Campbell) — 4:31

Music video
The music video for the single was released on August 24, 2011. It features Nicks, Mike Campbell, and David A. Stewart riding Nicks' tour bus in the desert. Nicks is featured in various desert scenes in one of her trademark outfits.

Live performances
Nicks appeared on America's Got Talent on July 27, 2011, making the televised debut of "For What It's Worth" as well as performed her song "Edge of Seventeen". She also performed the single on The Tonight Show with Jay Leno on July 28. On August 26, 2011, Nicks performed "For What It's Worth", "Landslide", and "Rhiannon" on Good Morning America as part of its Summer Concert Series.

Charts

References

2011 songs
Stevie Nicks songs
Songs written by Stevie Nicks
Songs written by Mike Campbell (musician)